Germania in Numidia is a former ancient city and Roman bishopric and current Latin Catholic titular see. It was in the Roman province of Numidia.

History 
Germania was thought to have been located near modern Ksar-El-Kelb? in present-day Algeria. It was sufficiently important within the Roman province of Numidia to be a suffragan bishopric of the Metropolitan Archdiocese of Cirta (modern Constantine), but faded.

Bishopric

Ancient bishops
A bishopric was established here During the Roman Empire. It stopped functioning in the 7th century with the Islamic expansion. Known bishops include
Innocence  (fl 411)
Crescenzo  (fl. 484)

Titular see 
The diocese was nominally restored as a titular see in 1933.
It has had the following (near-consecutive) incumbents, both of the lowest (episcopal) and intermediary (archiepiscopal) ranks:
 Titular Archbishop Cardinal Augustin Bea, Jesuits (S.J.) (1962.04.05 – 1962.04.20)
 Titular Bishop José del Carmen Valle Gallardo (1963.07.25 – 1966.11.21)
 Titular Bishop Ângelo Maria Rivato, S.J. (1967.06.13 – 1978.05.26)
 Titular Bishop Domingo Salvador Castagna (1978.11.24 – 1984.08.28), Auxiliary Bishop of Buenos Aires (Argentina) (1978.11.24 – 1984.08.28), later Bishop of San Nicolás de los Arroyos (Argentina) (1984.08.28 – 1994.06.22) and Metropolitan Archbishop of Corrientes (Argentina) (1994.06.22 – 2007.09.27)
 Titular Bishop Isaías Duarte Cancino (1985.04.10 – 1988.06.18), Auxiliary Bishop of Bucaramanga (Colombia) (1985.04.10 – 1988.06.18), Bishop of Apartadó (Colombia) (1988.06.18 – 1995.08.19), Metropolitan Archbishop of Cali (Colombia) (1995.08.19 – 2002.03.16)
 Titular Archbishop Erwin Josef Ender (1990.03.15 – 2022.12.19), Apostolic Nuncio (papal ambassador) emeritus to Germany

See also
List of Catholic titular sees

References

Source and External links 
 GigaCatholic, with titular incumbent biography links

Catholic titular sees in Africa